"Hallucination" is a song by Kosovo-Albanian disc jockey Regard and British band Years & Years from the streaming edition of the latter's third studio album, Night Call (Deluxe) (2022). Regard produced the song and wrote it along with Olly Alexander and Jean-Jacques Goldman, Joel Little, Nadia Mladjao and Stéfane Goldman. Ministry of Sound released it as a single for digital download and streaming on 18 February 2022. Featuring a sample of the Filatov & Karas remix of Imany's single "Don't Be So Shy", it is an '80s-inspired and four-on-the-floor-driven disco and synth-pop song, with the lyrics warning off serial heartbreakers.

"Hallucination" received generally positive reviews from music critics, many of whom commended the song's lyrics and nature as well as Years & Years' vocal delivery. It topped the charts in Bulgaria and Russia, and reached the top 10 in the Commonwealth of Independent States (CIS), Croatia and Ukraine. The duo performed the song for the first time on the British comedy show The Graham Norton Show in February 2022. The accompanying music video premiered on Regard's official YouTube channel on 11 March. Inspired by the 1969 psychological drama film They Shoot Horses, Don't They?, the video depicts the singer performing contemporary choreography in a dark setting.

Background and composition 

"Hallucination" was released as a single for digital download and streaming by Ministry of Sound in various territories on 18 February 2022. Regard produced the song and co-wrote it with Olly Alexander, Jean-Jacques Goldman, Joel Little, Nadia Mladjao and Stéfane Goldman. Musically, it is an English-language '80s-inspired and four-on-the-floor-driven disco and synth-pop song, featuring a sample of the Filatov & Karas remix of French singer Imany's single "Don't Be So Shy" (2015). The lyrics find Years & Years' member Olly Alexander warning off serial heartbreakers and all of the facets. Concerning its meaning, Alexander stated:

Reception 

"Hallucination" was met with generally positive reviews from music critics. While Cerys Kenneally of The Line of Best Fit labelled it as an "anthem", Isabel von Glahn from Westdeutscher Rundfunk (WDR) highlighted the song's lyrics as "exciting" and noted its "club banger" potential. In writing for Radio Sound, the editor equally commended the song, writing that it "is a perfect track for the dance floor". For Wyspa.fm, Przemysław Kokot complimented the song's blend of synth-pop as well as Alexander's "sensual" vocal delivery, and characterised it as an "flawlessly shimmering banger". Radio FG's Antony Harari further commended the collaboration between Regard and Years & Years. Commercially, "Hallucination" topped the rankings in Bulgaria and Russia, and entered the top 10 in the Commonwealth of Independent States (CIS), Croatia and Ukraine. The song further reached number 17 in Hungary, number 45 in Slovakia, number 56 in the United Kingdom and number 39 on New Zealand's Hot Singles chart as well as number 28 on the US Billboard Dance/Electronic Songs chart. It received airplay among radio stations in Estonia, Latvia, North Macedonia, Serbia and the United Arab Emirates.

Promotion 

An accompanying music video for "Hallucination" was uploaded to Regard's official YouTube channel on 11 March 2022. Directed by Sophia Ray, the video's concept was inspired by the American psychological drama film They Shoot Horses, Don't They? (1969). It depicts Alexander as an "apprehensive contestant" at the centre of a dark surrounding performing a contemporary-described choreography accompanied by several background dancers. Interspersed scenes through the main plot portray Regard as a "mysteriously sinister-driving force" behind the scenes and the dancers through television screens. A critic likened the concept of the video to that of British anthology series Black Mirror and South Korean survival drama Squid Game. Promo News' Rob Ulitski opined that "the video is a tour de force of creativity, wrapped in vibrant layers of choreography, post-apocalyptic styling and futuristic art direction, and emanates a minacious yet playful tone throughout". Wyspa.fm's Przemysław highlighted the video's concept and further stated that "[it] is the perfect contradiction to an 80s-inspired synth-pop song that combines futurism with reinvented nostalgia". To further promote the song, Regard and Years & Years performed "Hallucination" at the Printworks in London, UK, as well as on the British comedy show The Graham Norton Show in February 2022.

Track listing 
Digital download and streaming
"Hallucination"2:54

Digital download and streamingExtended
"Hallucination" (Extended)3:47

Digital download and streamingRemixes
"Hallucination" (Drop G Remix)3:13
"Hallucination" (Luude Remix)2:47
"Hallucination" (Navos Remix)2:30

Charts

Weekly charts

Monthly charts

Year-end charts

Release history

Notes

References 

2022 singles
2022 songs
British disco songs
English-language Albanian songs
Ministry of Sound singles
Regard (DJ) songs
Songs written by Jean-Jacques Goldman
Songs written by Joel Little
Songs written by Olly Alexander
Synth-pop songs
Years & Years songs